The Goulburn Football Club is a defunct Australian Rules Football club from Goulburn, New South Wales. The club competed in the CANFL from 1932 - 1936. The club wore pale blue colours and were known as the 'Waratahs'.

Premierships
Goulburn won one CANFL title in 1932 when they defeated Manuka 7.18 (60) to 5.6 (36).

See also
AFL Canberra

External links
Fullpointsfooty
Goulburn City Swans history

Australian rules football clubs in New South Wales